Émile Barral was a sailor from Monaco, who represented his country at the 1924 Summer Olympics in Meulan, France. He also competed in the men's 800 metres at the 1920 Summer Olympics.

References

Sources
 
 

1891 births
1961 deaths
Athletes (track and field) at the 1920 Summer Olympics
Sailors at the 1924 Summer Olympics – Monotype
Sailors at the 1928 Summer Olympics – 12' Dinghy
Olympic sailors of Monaco
Olympic athletes of Monaco
Monegasque male sailors (sport)
Monegasque male middle-distance runners